David Dejiro Defiagbon (12 June 1970 – 24 November 2018) was a Nigerian boxer. Nicknamed "The Dream", Defiagbon fought for Canada and won the heavyweight silver medal at the 1996 Summer Olympics.

Amateur
Born in Sapele, Nigeria, Defiagbon won gold in the welterweight (– 67 kg) division at the 1990 Commonwealth Games. As a light-middleweight, he won a bronze medal in the 1991 All-Africa Games in Cairo. In 1992 in Barcelona at the Summer Olympics he represented Nigeria and was eliminated in the first round of the light middleweight division (7 to 8 against Raúl Márquez).

Defiagbon went on to fight for Canada for whom he won the heavyweight silver medal (limit 201 lbs) at the 1996 Summer Olympics beating Nate Jones, losing to Félix Savón.

Results
1990 Commonwealth Games
Defeated James Pender (Scotland) RSCH-3
Defeated Alfred Ankamah (Ghana) 5–0
Defeated Anthony Mwamba (Zambia) 4–1
Defeated Greg Johnson (Canada) 5–0

1992 Summer Olympics
Lost to Raúl Márquez (United States) 7–8

1996 Summer Olympics
1st round bye
Defeated Omar Ahmed (Kenya) 15–4
Defeated Christophe Mendy (France) DQ 3 (1:01)
Defeated Nate Jones (United States) 10–16
Lost to Félix Savón (Cuba) 2–20

Professional

In his first step up, he took on comebacking Oleg Maskaev, who defeated Defiagbon via split decision. In his final bout, Defiagbon fought Cuba's former world cruiserweight champion Juan Carlos Gomez, who scored a TKO stoppage win at heavyweight over Defiagbon in the third round, ending Defiagbon's career.

Professional boxing record

|-
|align="center" colspan=8|21 Wins (12 knockouts, 9 decisions), 2 Losses (1 knockout, 1 decision) 
|-
| align="center" style="border-style: none none solid solid; background: #e3e3e3"|Result
| align="center" style="border-style: none none solid solid; background: #e3e3e3"|Record
| align="center" style="border-style: none none solid solid; background: #e3e3e3"|Opponent
| align="center" style="border-style: none none solid solid; background: #e3e3e3"|Type
| align="center" style="border-style: none none solid solid; background: #e3e3e3"|Round
| align="center" style="border-style: none none solid solid; background: #e3e3e3"|Date
| align="center" style="border-style: none none solid solid; background: #e3e3e3"|Location
| align="center" style="border-style: none none solid solid; background: #e3e3e3"|Notes
|-align=center
|Loss
|
|align=left| Juan Carlos Gomez
|TKO
|3
|2005-01-15
|align=left| Magdeburg, Germany
|align=left|
|-
|Loss
|
|align=left| Oleg Maskaev
|SD
|10
|2004-07-23
|align=left| Atlantic City, New Jersey, US
|align=left|
|-
|Win
|
|align=left| Ron Guerrero
|TKO
|5
|2004-06-12
|align=left| Devonshire Parish, Bermuda
|align=left|
|-
|Win
|
|align=left| Ken Murphy
|UD
|6
|2004-03-13
|align=left| Columbus, Ohio, US
|align=left|
|-
|Win
|
|align=left| Joe Lenhart
|UD
|6
|2003-04-26
|align=left| Las Vegas, Nevada, US
|align=left|
|-
|Win
|
|align=left| Ramon Hayes
|UD
|6
|2002-09-29
|align=left| Lemoore, California, US
|align=left|
|-
|Win
|
|align=left| Gary Winmon
|TKO
|2
|2002-02-16
|align=left| Las Vegas, Nevada, US
|align=left|
|-
|Win
|
|align=left| Reynaldo Minus
|TKO
|4
|2001-09-28
|align=left| Las Vegas, Nevada, US
|align=left|
|-
|Win
|
|align=left| Harold Sconiers
|KO
|5
|2001-07-06
|align=left| Reno, Nevada, US
|align=left|
|-
|Win
|
|align=left| Louis Monaco
|UD
|8
|2000-10-04
|align=left| Canyonville, Oregon, US
|align=left|
|-
|Win
|
|align=left| Agustin Corpus
|UD
|6
|2000-08-24
|align=left| Worley, Idaho, US
|align=left|
|-
|Win
|
|align=left| Tim Pollard
|TKO
|1
|2000-05-05
|align=left| Las Vegas, Nevada, US
|align=left|
|-
|Win
|
|align=left| James Jones
|UD
|6
|1999-07-01
|align=left| Tunica, Mississippi, US
|align=left|
|-
|Win
|
|align=left| John Kiser
|UD
|8
|1999-05-06
|align=left| Tacoma, Washington, US
|align=left|
|-
|Win
|
|align=left| Terry Verners
|TKO
|1
|1999-03-20
|align=left| Tacoma, Washington, US
|align=left|
|-
|Win
|
|align=left| Wesley Martin
|UD
|6
|1999-02-18
|align=left| Bossier City, Louisiana, US
|align=left|
|-
|Win
|
|align=left| Ritchie Goosehead
|KO
|3
|1998-08-06
|align=left| Slave Lake, Alberta, Canada
|align=left|
|-
|Win
|
|align=left| Anthony Moore
|TKO
|3
|1998-06-27
|align=left| Vancouver, British Columbia, Canada
|align=left|
|-
|Win
|
|align=left| Dean Storey
|KO
|1
|1998-05-08
|align=left| Red Deer, Alberta, Canada
|align=left|
|-
|Win
|
|align=left| [[Don Laliberte
|KO
|2
|1998-02-13
|align=left| Edmonton, Alberta, Canada
|align=left|
|-
|Win
|
|align=left| Dwight Staten
|TKO
|1
|1998-01-23
|align=left| Las Vegas, Nevada, US
|align=left|
|-
|Win
|
|align=left| Alonzo Hollis
|UD
|6
|1997-03-04
|align=left| Toronto, Ontario, Canada
|align=left|
|-
|Win
|
|align=left| Bill Dorsch
|TKO
|1
|1996-10-19
|align=left| Halifax, Nova Scotia, Canada
|align=left|
|}

Death 
Defiagbon died of heart complications in Las Vegas, Nevada on 24 November 2018. He was 48.

References

External links
 
 
 
 

Nigerian male boxers
Black Canadian boxers
1970 births
2018 deaths
Boxers at the 1992 Summer Olympics
Boxers at the 1996 Summer Olympics
Olympic boxers of Canada
Olympic boxers of Nigeria
Olympic silver medalists for Canada
Olympic medalists in boxing
Boxers at the 1990 Commonwealth Games
Commonwealth Games gold medallists for Nigeria
Canadian male boxers
Medalists at the 1996 Summer Olympics
Commonwealth Games medallists in boxing
African Games bronze medalists for Nigeria
African Games medalists in boxing
Nigerian emigrants to Canada
Competitors at the 1991 All-Africa Games
Welterweight boxers
Medallists at the 1990 Commonwealth Games